This is a comprehensive list of armories and arsenals in New York City and surrounding counties of New York (i.e., in the New York metropolitan and downstate New York areas).

This list details the structures built between the 18th and 20th century.  Many armories were constructed during this period; a few have since disappeared over time, while others have been converted to different uses. Through the decades these structures have been referred to under various names, and this catalog attempts to capture their identity. The list is arranged as follows:

The first unit; street (of reference); region or neighborhood (if referred to as such); year built; address; and name of neighborhood where available.

New York City

Bronx (New York County1 and Bronx County)
 (2nd) Second Battery / Bathgate Avenue / Tremont Armory (year unknown – built prior to 1902)2 – 1887 / 1891 Bathgate Avenue (between East Tremont Avenue (East 177th Street) and East 176th Street), Tremont
 St. John's College / Fordham College / Fordham University / Rose Hill / Armory Hall (year unknown – built prior to 1906)3; 4 – Rose Hill Campus Administration Building, 441 East Fordham Road, Fordham Manor
 (2nd) Second Battery / Franklin Avenue / Morrisania Armory (1906–1911; 1926–1928 expansion) – 1122 Franklin Avenue (at East 166th Street), Morrisania
 (8th) Eighth Regiment ((8th) Eighth Coastal Artillery) / Kingsbridge Road / Kingsbridge Armory (1913; 1912–1917) – 29 Kingsbridge Road (between Jerome Avenue and Reservoir Avenue); (1950's and 60's annex) – 10 West 195th Street (between Jerome Avenue and Reservoir Avenue), Jerome Park

Notes:
1. The armories in Bronx were built prior to the borough becoming a separate county in 1914.  Before then, it was still part of New York County, which the western section of the present day borough joined in 1874 and the eastern section in 1895.  It was previously part of Westchester County (1683).
2.  The Tremont Armory at Bathgate Avenue, was a temporary facility used by the (2nd) Second Battery in 1902 until the unit moved to the new Franklin Ave Armory in 1910.
3. The Rose Hill Armory Hall is a later period annexed building to the (New) Rose Hill Manor / Mansion which was built in 1838 and is currently known as the Fordham University Rose Hill Campus Administration Building.
4. Armory Hall at Fordham University does not have a unit detail nor formal street crossing.  Therefore, it is recognized by the names of the school representing the site and the campus.

Brooklyn (Kings County)
 (47th) Forty-seventh Regiment / Marcy Avenue / Williamsburg Armory (1883–1884) – 355 Marcy Avenue (between Heyward Street and Lynch Street), Williamsburg
 (23rd) Twenty-third Regiment / Clermont Avenue / Clinton Hill Armory (1872–1873; 1911 expansion) – 165-179 Clermont Avenue (between Myrtle Avenue and Willoughby Avenue), Clinton Hill
 (3rd) Third (Gatling) Battery / Dean Street-Crown Heights Armory (1885–1886) – 793-801 Dean Street (between Washington Avenue and Grand Avenue), Crown Heights
 (23rd) Twenty-third Regiment / Bedford Avenue-Crown Heights Armory (1891–1895) – 1322 Bedford Avenue (between Atlantic Avenue and Pacific Street), Crown Heights
 (14th) Fourteenth Regiment / (8th) Eighth Avenue / Park Slope Armory (1891–1895) – 1402 8th Avenue (between 14th Street and 15th Street), Park Slope
 (13th) Thirteenth Regiment / Sumner Avenue (Marcus Garvey Boulevard) / Bedford-Stuyvesant Armory (1892–1894) – 357 Marcus Garvey Boulevard (between Putnam Avenue and Jefferson Avenue), Bedford-Stuyvesant
 Troop C / Bedford Avenue Armory (1903–07) – 1579 Bedford Avenue (between Union Street and President Street), Crown Heights
 (2nd) Second Avenue / Sunset Park / Brooklyn Arsenal (1925; 1924–26)2 – 201 / 207 64th Street (between 2nd Avenue and 3rd Avenue), Sunset Park / Brooklyn Army Terminal

Defunct (no longer exist):
 Brooklyn City Guard / Adams Street / Gothic Hall Armory (1830s) – Gothic Alley1 and Adams Street, Downtown Brooklyn
 (13th) Thirteenth Regiment / Henry Street Armory (1858) – Henry Street (at Cranberry Street), Brooklyn Heights
 (2nd) Second Division / North Portland Avenue / State Arsenal (1858)2 – North Portland Avenue (N Portland Avenue) and Auburn Place; (1877–1878 Expansion for (14th) Fourteenth Regiment – renamed to Armory), Fort Greene
 (23rd) Twenty-third Regiment / Fulton Street / Orange Street Armory  (1863) – Orange Street and Fulton Street (present day Old Fulton Street / Cadman Plaza West), Downtown Brooklyn / Brooklyn Heights
 (47th) Forty-seventh Regiment / Fourth and North Second Streets Armory (1864) – Fourth Street (present day Bedford Avenue) and North Second Street (N 2nd St; present day Metropolitan Avenue), North Williamsburg
 (32nd) Thirty-second Battalion & Regiment / Stagg Street Armory (1868) – Stagg Street and Bushwick Boulevard, East Williamsburg
 (13th) Thirteenth Regiment / Flatbush Avenue Armory (1874–1875) – Flatbush Avenue (at Hanson Place), Fort Greene
 (2nd) Second Battalion Naval Militia / First Avenue Armory (1902–1903) – 1st Avenue (between 51st Street and 52nd Street), Sunset Park / Bush Terminal
 Johnson Street Armory (year unknown) – Johnson Street, Downtown Brooklyn

Notes:
1. Gothic Alley no longer exists in the current New York City grid. Its western section ended near the BRT Fulton Street Line (elevated) (present day Old Fulton Street / Cadman Plaza). Several buildings now occupy the street. Both Pearl Street and Nassau Street sections of this area were also decreased and no longer run through there.
2. The (2nd) Second Avenue / Sunset Park / Brooklyn Arsenal (1925; 1924–1926) building replaced the (2nd) Second Division / North Portland Avenue / State Arsenal (1858).

Manhattan (New York County)
 (7th) Seventh Regiment / Fifth Avenue / Central Park Arsenal (1848)1 – (830) Fifth Avenue (at East 64th Street), Central Park
 (7th) Seventh Regiment / Park Avenue / Lenox Hill Armory (1877–1879; 1909–1914 renovations) – 643 Park Avenue (between 66th Street and 67th Street), Lenox Hill
 Squadron A / Madison Avenue / Carnegie Hill Armory (1894–1895)2 – 1339 / 1345 Madison Avenue (between East 94th Street and East 95th Street), Carnegie Hill
 (1st) First Battery / West 66th Street / Lincoln Square Armory (1901–1903)3 – 56 West 66th Street (between Columbus Avenue and Central Park West (Eighth Avenue) – present day Lincoln Square neighborhood
 (69th) Sixty-ninth Regiment / Lexington Avenue / Flatiron District Armory (1904–1906) – 68 Lexington Avenue (between East 25th and East 26th streets), Flatiron District
 (22nd) Twenty-second Corps of Engineers / Fort Washington Avenue / Washington Heights Armory (1911) – 216 Fort Washington Avenue (168th Street and Fort Washington Avenue), Washington Heights
 (369th) Three Hundred and Sixty-ninth Regiment / Fifth Avenue / Harlem Armory (1924; 1930–1933 expansion) – 2366 Fifth Avenue (between West 142nd Street and West 143rd Street), Laurel Hill / North Harlem

Defunct (no longer exist):
 Fifth Avenue Arsenal (ca. 1808)1 – (830) Fifth Avenue (at East 64th Street), Central Park
 State Arsenal (ca. 1808)3 – Between White Street, Franklin Street, Elm Place (today Lafayette Street), and Center Street, Tribeca
 (7th) Seventh Regiment / Centre Market Armory (1830s) – Grand Street and Centre Street, present day Little Italy / Chinatown neighborhood
 (1st) First Division / Downtown Arsenal (1844)4 – Between White Street, Franklin Street, Elm Place (today Lafayette Street), and Center Street, Tribeca
 (7th) Seventh Regiment / Third Avenue / Tompkins Market Armory (1857–60) – Third Avenue (between East 6th and East 7th streets), East Village
 (1st) First Division / State Arsenal (1858) – Seventh Avenue (at West 35th Street), Garment District
 (22nd) Twenty-Second Regiment / 14th Street Armory (1863; 1872–1882 renovation)5 – 125 West 14th Street (between Sixth Avenue and Seventh Avenue), Chelsea
 (12th) Twelfth Regiment / Columbus Avenue Armory (1886–1887)6 – Columbus Avenue (between West 61st and West 62nd streets), present day Lincoln Square
 (8th) Eighth Regiment / Park Avenue Armory (1888–1889)2 – Park Avenue (between East 94th and East 95th streets), Carnegie Hill

 (22nd) Twenty-Second Regiment / (1st) First Field Artillery / Broadway Armory (1889–1892) – 1988 Broadway (formerly Western Boulevard; between Broadway, Columbus Avenue, West 67th Street and West 68th Street), present day Lincoln Square
 (9th) Ninth Regiment / West 14th Street Armory (1894–1896)5 – 125 West 14th Street (between Sixth Avenue and Seventh Avenue), Chelsea
 (71st) Seventy-first Regiment / Park Avenue Armory (1894–1902)7 – Park Avenue (between East 33rd and East 34th streets), Midtown South
 (71st) Seventy-first New York Volunteers / Park Avenue Armory (1904–1906)7 – Park Avenue (between East 33rd and East 34th streets), Midtown South
 (42nd) Forty-Second Division / West 14th Street Armory (1971)5 – 125 West 14th Street (between Sixth Avenue and Seventh Avenue), Chelsea

Notes:
1.  The Fifth Avenue Arsenal (ca. 1808) was replaced by the (7th) Seventh Regiment / Fifth Avenue / Central Park Arsenal (1848) on the same site.
2. The(8th) Eighth Regiment / Park Avenue Armory (1888–1889) was replaced by the Squadron A / Madison Avenue / Carnegie Hill Armory (1894–1895) on the same site.
3. The Lincoln Square Armory building is currently part of ABC Studios and is at times referred to as such.
4. The State Arsenal (ca. 1808) was eventually replaced by (1st) First Division / Downtown Arsenal (1844)) on the same site.
5. The (22nd) Twenty-Second Regiment / 14th Street Armory (1863) building was replaced with the (9th) Ninth Regiment / West 14th Street Armory (1894–1896) building, which was later replaced by (42nd) Forty-Second Division / West 14th Street Armory (1971) building, which in turn was replaced by a mix residential use structure, all on the same site.
6. The former site of the (12th) Twelfth Regiment / Columbus Avenue Armory (1886–1887) is now occupied by Fordham University's Lincoln Square campus where a memorial is dedicated by the 12th Regiment.
7. The (71st) Seventy-first Regiment / Park Avenue Armory (1894–1902) building was eventually replaced by (71st) Seventy-first New York Volunteers / Park Avenue Armory (1904–1906) on the same site.

Queens (Queens County)
 (10th) Tenth Infantry Regiment / Northern Boulevard / Flushing Armory (1904–1906) – 137-58 Northern Boulevard (between Main Street and Union Street), Flushing
 Naval Militia / 6th Avenue / Whitestone Armory (1913) – 150-74 6th Avenue (between Clintonville Street and Powells Cove Boulevard), Whitestone
 (104th) One Hundred and Fourth Field Artillery / 172nd Street-Jamaica Armory (year unknown – built before 1924)1 – 92-10 172nd Street (between Jamaica Avenue and 93rd Avenue), Jamaica
 (104th) One Hundred and Fourth Field Artillery / 168th Street-Jamaica Armory (1936) – 93-05 168th Street (between 93rd Avenue and Douglas Avenue), Jamaica

Defunct (no longer exists):
 Flushing Guards / (17th) Seventeenth Separate Company / Amity Street Armory (1884) – 170 Amity Street (now Roosevelt Avenue, near Main Street)2, Flushing

Notes:
1. According to NYCityMap historical aerials the 172nd Street-Jamaica Armory building was present in 1924.  Still, the (104th) One Hundred and Fourth Field Artillery used the building as a temporary facility between 1929–1936 until the new 168th Street-Jamaica Armory was completed.
2. When the IRT Flushing Line was extended along Roosevelt Avenue into Flushing, Amity Street was absorbed and the name Roosevelt Avenue was placed to follow the train line.

Staten Island (Richmond County)

 (101st) One Hundred and First Cavalry Squadron / Castleton Corners / Staten Island Armory (1922) – 321 Manor Road (at Merriman Avenue), Castleton Corners

Westchester County 

Mount Vernon
 (27th) Twenty-seventh Infantry Regiment / Mount Vernon Armory (1888-–1889) – 144 North Fifth Avenue (at North Street), Downtown Mount Vernon

New Rochelle
 (31st) Thirty First Fleet Division of New York / New Rochelle Armory (1932–1933) – 270 Main Street (between Rhodes Street and Pratt Street; adjacent to Faneuil Park), Homestead Park

Ossining
 (101st) One Hundred and First Signal / Ossining Armory (1961) – 101 Route 9A / Albany Post Road (at Broadway)

Peekskill
 (156th) One Hundred and Fifty-six Field Artillery Regiment / Peekskill Armory (1932–1933) – 955 Washington Street (between Lindbergh Avenue and Lounsbury Lane)

Valhalla
 (42nd) Forty-second Military Police / Valhalla Armory (1986) – 2 Dana Road (at Sunshine Cottage Road)

White Plains
 (49th) Forty-ninth Separate Company / White Plains Armory (1909–10) – 35 South Broadway (at Mitchell Place); 65 Mitchell Place

Yonkers
 (4th) Fourth Separate Company / Waverly Street-Yonkers Armory (1890s) – 92 Waverly Street (at Maple Street), Getty Square / Downtown Yonkers
 (10th) Tenth Infantry Regiment / North Broadway-Yonkers Armory (1918) – 127 North Broadway (at Quincy Place), Getty Square / Downtown Yonkers
 (101st) One Hundred and First Signal Battalion / Quincy Place-Yonkers Armory (1988) – 2 Quincy Place (at N Broadway), Getty Square / Downtown Yonkers

Rockland County 

Orangeburg
 (101st) One Hundred and First Signal / Orangeburg Armory (1961) – 84 Old Orangeburg Road (between 1st Avenue and Edgewood Drive)

Monsey (formerly Viola)
 (17th) Seventeenth Infantry Regiment / Viola Armory (1863) – 198 Viola Road

Dutchess County 

Poughkeepsie
 (19th) Nineteenth Separate Company / Market Street-Poughkeepsie Armory (1891–1892) – 61 Market Street (at Church Street / East-West Arterial)

Defunct (no longer exists):
 (21st) Twenty-first Infantry Regiment / Main Street-Poughkeepsie Armory (at the Kirchner Building) (1872) – 278/282 Main Street

Orange County 
Middletown
 (24th) Twenty-fourth Separate Company / Middletown Armory (1891–1892) – 52 Highland Drive (at Wickham Avenue)

Newburgh
 (19th) Infantry Regiment / Broadway-Newburgh Armory (1879) – 145 Broadway (at South Johnson Street)
 (156th) On Hundred and Fifty-sixth Field Artillery Regiment / South William Street-Newburgh Armory (1931–1932) – 321 South William Street (between Walsh Road and South Robinson Avenue)

Ulster County 
Kingston
 (20th) Twentieth Infantry Battalion / Broadway-Kingston Armory (1879) – 467 Broadway (at Hoffman Street)
 (156th) On Hundred and Fifty-sixth Field Artillery Regiment / Kiersted Avenue-Kingston Armory (1932) – 25 Kiersted Avenue (formerly North Manor Road)

Long Island

Nassau County 

Freeport
 (142nd) One Hundred and Forty-second Artillery / Freeport Armory (1961) – 63 Babylon Turnpike (between Lakeview Avenue and Meadowbrook State Parkway)

Hempstead
 (102nd) One Hundred and Second Observation Squadron / Hempstead Armory (1927–1929) – 216 Washington Street (between Lent Avenue and Webb Avenue)

Suffolk County 

Bay Shore
 (142nd) One Hundred and Forty-second Artillery / Bay Shore Armory (1955) – 70 Brentwood Road, (between Redington Street and Union Boulevard)

Huntington Station
 Battery C of 1st Missile Battalion / Huntington Station Armory (1958–1960) – 100 East 5th Street (by Park Avenue)

Nesconset
 (587th) Five Hundred and Eighty-seventh Transportation Squadron / Nesconset Armory (1961) – 148 Smithtown Boulevard (between Mayfair Road and Southern Boulevard)

Patchogue
 (142nd) One Hundred and Forty-second Artillery / Patchogue Armory (1961) – 100 Barton Avenue (between Mt Vernon Avenue and Tremont Avenue)

Riverhead
 (140th) One Hundred and Fortieth Transportation Squadron / Riverhead Armory (1957) – 1405 Old Country Road (between Osborn Avenue and Pulaski Street)

Ronkonkoma
 (142nd) One Hundred Forty-second Aviation / Ronkonkoma Armory (year unknown) – 201 Schafer Drive (by Clark Drive)

Known rented facilities 
Source

Manhattan
1st Regiment – Sixth Avenue near Broadway (pre 1871)
5th Regiment – Hester Street (pre 1871)
6th Regiment – 14th Street (between Third Avenue and Lexington Avenue) (pre 1871)
8th Regiment – Upper floors of a commercial building at 226 West 23rd Street (between Seventh Avenue and Eighth Avenue) (1871–1878)
8th Regiment – Loft in the Old Broadway Stage stables at Ninth Avenue and West 27th Street (1880–1887)
8th Regiment – 281 Ninth Avenue (1883)
8th Regiment – Private house on Seventh Avenue (between West 34th Street and West 35th Street) (1879–1880)
8th & 69th Regiment – Broadway above Hester (pre 1871)
11th Regiment – Corner of Grand Street and Ludlow Street (1883)
11th Regiment – Delancey Street near Bowery Street (pre 1871)
12th Regiment – "Natural School" on 4th Street at Broadway (pre 1886)
12th Regiment – Broadway at 34th Street (pre 1886)
55th Regiment – Second Avenue (pre 1871)
69th Regiment – Essex Market (at the corner of Grand Street and Essex Street) (1871–sass's)
71st Regiment – Brick building on West 32nd Street near Sixth Avenue
71st Regiment – Commercial building on Broadway between West 35th Street and West 36th Street (1887–1889)
84th Regiment – Second Avenue (pre 1871)
96th Regiment – Bowery Street near East Houston (pre 1871)
1st Artillery – Sixth Avenue above 23rd Street (pre 1871)
1st Battery – 334–346 West 44th Street, above a saloon
1st & 3rd Cavalry – Bowery Street below Canal Street (pre 1871)
Lindsey Blues (Independent Company) – 81 Broadway (1860s)
Troop A – Dickel's Riding Academy – 136 East 56th Street (1890s)
Washington Grey Troop 	- Broadway, by 34th Street and Sixth Avenue (pre 1871)

Brooklyn
47th Regiment – Fifth Street in Odeon building (1862–1864)

Queens
17th Separate Company – Housed temporarily in Peck and Fayerweather Store near Lawrence Street and Northern Boulevard

Yonkers
4th Separate Company – Post Lane near Main Street

Mount Vernon
27th Regiment – The 4th Avenue Hall

Ossining
101st Signal – St. John's Military Academy (1948–1958)
101st Signal – Camp Woods Road (firehouse located on upper floors) (1958–1961)

Peekskill
156th Field Artillery Regiment – Building on the corner of James Street and Park Street

Poughkeepsie
Old carriage factory from (1865–1872)

Middletown
24th Separate Company – Unit was housed temporarily in a large local building known as the Casino (pre 1892)

Existing and vanished armory and arsenal buildings 
The following two tables illustrate the armory and arsenal structures that still exist, and the ones that have vanished.

Existing

Vanished

See also 
 List of National Historic Landmarks in New York
 List of National Historic Landmarks in New York City
 National Register of Historic Places listings in New York
 National Register of Historic Places listings in New York City (disambiguation)
 List of New York City Designated Landmarks
 List of New York State Historic Sites
 New York State Armory
 List of New York Civil War regiments
 Historic preservation in New York
 New York City Landmarks Preservation Commission

References 
Notes

External links 

 U.S. National Register of Historic Places
 U.S. National Historic Landmark
 National Register of Historic Places.com
 The New York City Landmarks Preservation Commission
 Library of Congress
 New York State Library
 New York Public Library
 Neighborhood Preservation Center
 Forgotten-NY
 Beautiful Castles in Brooklyn, New York City
 NY State Archives and Records Agency
 NYC Landmarks Designation Reports
 New York City Landmarks Preservation Commission flickr Group
 New York State Division of Military and Naval Affairs
 New York State Division of Military and Naval Affairs – Links

 
.
Military facilities in New York City
Military installations in New York (state)
Lists of buildings and structures in New York City
Landmarks in New York City
Military history of New York City
Military history of New York (state)
Military units and formations in New York (state)